Guinn or Gwynn(e) Williams may refer to:

Guinn Williams (Texas politician) (1871–1948), American state senator and congressman from Texas
W. S. Gwynn Williams (1896–1978), Welsh musician
Guinn "Big Boy" Williams (1899–1962), American actor
Gwynne Williams (born 1937), Welsh poet and translator

See also
John Williams Gwynne (1889–1972), Republican congressman from Iowa
Williams (surname)